Albert Louis Aublet (18 January 1851, in Paris – 3 March 1938, in Neuilly-sur-Seine) was a French painter known primarily for his genre scenes and nudes.

Biography
Trained in the workshops of Claudius Jacquand and Jean-Léon Gérôme, he had his first exhibit at the Salon in 1873. He received honorable mention there in 1879 and was awarded a third-class medal in 1880. He also collected medals at several international events, including the Exposition Universelle of 1889. He was decorated with the Legion of Honor in 1890.

During his overseas trip in 1881, his experiences in the Middle East had a profound influence on his artistic inspiration. Istanbul left an especially strong impression on him. His first Orientalist painting "Turkish Woman in the Baths" was a great success and he became President of the Société des Artistes in Tunis.

He was also a professor at the École nationale supérieure des Beaux-Arts, and is believed to have been the inspiration for M. Biche, a fictional painter in Remembrance of Things Past by Marcel Proust.

His son was the architect,  (1901–1980), who married Marie-Germaine Ablett, daughter of the painter William Ablett, in 1931.

Selected paintings

References

External links
 

1851 births
1937 deaths
19th-century French painters
20th-century French painters
20th-century French male artists
Painters from Paris
Recipients of the Legion of Honour
Orientalist painters
French male painters
19th-century French male artists